The Bare-handed Pelota First League Doubles known as Campeonato de España de mano parejas is the second most important tournament of Hand-pelota category in Basque pelota, after the 1st Hand-Pelota singles championship, known as manomanista. The teams are formed by a Forward and a Defender, and the games are played to 22 points.

History 
The competition was created by the Spanish Federation of Basque Pelota on 1941 at the same time of manomanista, played every 2 years, but for a lack of interest and agreement the competition was suspended until 1978. On 1973 the two hand-pelota companies that operated at the time, Empresas Unidas and Eskulari, hold professional championships of doubles apart. 
In 1978 the companies finally agreed to merge both tournaments into one, named Campeonato de España (Championship of Spain). Since 1978 the championship is played yearly. The first winning partners were Onaindia and Urcelay, and the ones with most wins were Retegi II and Errandonea with 3 wins.

Awards 
The winners are awarded with a Txapela and a trophy (the winner are denomined  Txapelduns).

Championships

Pelotaris 

At the same time, the 2nd Hand-Pelota doubles championship is played by minor importance or rookie pelotaris giving the right to the winning partners to play in the 1st category tournament next year.

Basque pelota competitions